Banksia insulanemorecincta is a species of shrub that is endemic to a small region in the south-west of Western Australia. It is a bushy shrub with serrated, lance-shaped leaves with the narrower end towards the base, heads of about fifty cream-coloured and dull brown flowers and hairy, elliptical follicles.

Description
Banksia insulanemorecincta is a bushy shrub that typically grows to a height of  but does not form a lignotuber.

Taxonomy and naming
This banksia was discovered by Abe van de Sande, a West Australian government field officer. It was first formally described in 1999 by Alex George in Flora of Australia Volume 17B and given the name Dryandra insulanemorecincta from specimens he collected near Brookton in 1998. The specific epithet (insulanemorecincta, pronounced 'in-soo-la-ne-mor-ay-sink-ta') is from the Latin words insula meaning "an island", nemus "a wood or forest" and cinctus "to girdle" referring to the unusual habitat of this species.

Distribution and habitat
Banksia insulanemorecincta is known from several population on the Darling Plateau near Brookton where it grows in islands of low heath, surrounded by jarrah forest.

Conservation status
This banksia is classified as "Priority Four" by the Government of Western Australia Department of Parks and Wildlife, meaning that is rare or near threatened.

References

insulanemorecincta
Plants described in 1999
Taxa named by Alex George